Calumet Park (formerly DeYoung) is a village in Cook County, Illinois. The population was 7,025 at the 2020 census.

On May 13, 2010, Mayor Joseph DuPar and the Village Board approved renaming 127th Street as Obama Drive, in honor of the 44th President of the United States. On August 21, 2010, State Senator Emil Jones III read a proclamation of the Illinois Senate in honor of the dedication on the same date. This road became the first Obama Drive in the country and the first road named after President Barack Obama in his home state of Illinois.

Geography
Calumet Park is located at  (41.665602, -87.658139).

Demographics
As of the 2020 census there were 7,025 people, 3,256 households, and 1,973 families residing in the village. The racial makeup of the village was 3.36% White, 89.27% African American, 0.30% Native American, 0.09% Asian, 0.03% Pacific Islander, 3.77% from other races, and 3.19% from two or more races. Hispanic or Latino of any race were 6.45% of the population.

There were 3,256 households, out of which 38.76% had children under the age of 18 living with them, 23.68% were married couples living together, 30.41% had a female householder with no husband present, and 39.40% were non-families. 37.04% of all households were made up of individuals, and 10.23% had someone living alone who was 65 years of age or older. The average household size was 3.48 and the average family size was 2.57.

The village's age distribution consisted of 23.9% under the age of 18, 8.0% from 18 to 24, 23.5% from 25 to 44, 27.5% from 45 to 64, and 17.1% who were 65 years of age or older. The median age was 40.9 years. For every 100 females, there were 84.0 males. For every 100 females age 18 and over, there were 80.4 males.

The median income for a household in the village was $50,049, and the median income for a family was $60,689. Males had a median income of $41,402 versus $32,665 for females. The per capita income for the village was $25,250. About 15.5% of families and 19.4% of the population were below the poverty line, including 24.5% of those under age 18 and 17.7% of those age 65 or over.

Note: the US Census treats Hispanic/Latino as an ethnic category. This table excludes Latinos from the racial categories and assigns them to a separate category. Hispanics/Latinos can be of any race.

Government
Calumet Park is divided between two congressional districts. The area east of Interstate 57 and south of 123rd Street is in Illinois' 2nd Congressional District; the rest of the village is part of the 1st Congressional District.

References

External links
Village of Calumet Park official website
Community profile on Illinois Dept. of Commerce site

Villages in Illinois
Chicago metropolitan area
Villages in Cook County, Illinois
Populated places established in 1912
1912 establishments in Illinois
Majority-minority cities and towns in Cook County, Illinois